This was the first edition of the tournament.

Guillermo Durán and Nicolás Mejía won the title after defeating Diego Hidalgo and Cristian Rodríguez 6–4, 1–6, [10–7] in the final.

Seeds

Draw

References

External links
 Main draw

Challenger Coquimbo - Doubles
Challenger Coquimbo